Pedobacter agri is a species of Gram-negative bacteria. Its genome has been sequenced. Its type strain is PB92(T) (=KCTC 12511(T) =DSM 19486(T)).

References

Further reading
Whitman, William B., et al., eds. Bergey's manual® of systematic bacteriology. Vol. 5. Springer, 2012.
Fulthorpe, Roberta R., et al. "Distantly sampled soils carry few species in common." The ISME Journal 2.9 (2008): 901–910.

External links

LPSN
Type strain of Pedobacter agri at BacDive -  the Bacterial Diversity Metadatabase

Sphingobacteriia
Bacteria described in 2008